This is a list of Old Nalandians, alumni of Nalanda College Colombo, Sri Lanka.

Politicians

National

Provincial

Religion

Academia

Civil servants

Military

Army

Navy

Air Force

Police

Diplomats

Legal / Judiciary

Industry and commerce

Art

Authors

Actors

Media

Sports

Architects

Medicine

Other

References

Lists of Sri Lankan people by school affiliation
Colombo-related lists